Luke Busby (born 22 April 1981) is an English music producer-songwriter, best known for being part of UK electronic pop band Temposhark, with singer/songwriter Robert Diament.

Growing up 
Busby grew up in Buckinghamshire and was classically trained from an early age in trumpet (his first instrument), piano and cello. Busby was introduced to music by his father, Sid Busby, the world famous Jazz trumpet player, renowned for his successful Hollywood jazz albums. Throughout his childhood, Busby would often perform trumpet live with his father as part of a big band ensemble. The father and son also collaborated in 2001 on Sid Busby's album 'A Time For Love' on an orchestral track written by Luke Busby and recorded at CTS and Lansdowne recording studios in London. In 2006 Busby's trumpet skills were further demonstrated on two Temposhark remixes for artists Camille and Kate Havnevik.
It was at his secondary school in Reading, where he met his later collaborator Robert Diament (Temposhark) for the first time but the two never collaborated until leaving school many years later. In his teens, Busby's creative interests developed into art and film making as well as scoring music for film (in recent interviews he has often expressed an interest in writing musical scores for films). Busby's interest in computer programming and production intensified whilst studying Music Technology at A Level. Upon leaving school Busby went to art school at the respected Chelsea Art College before moving to Brighton to study film and music at art school, where his experimental work led him to produce multi-media work centred on sound and video installations, animations and performance.

Early musical career 
During his years in Brighton, Busby met and collaborated with fellow student Natasha Kahn, the artist/musician now known for her project Bat for Lashes. Around this time, Busby met up with his old school friend Robert Diament and together they began to study music in London at University of Westminster which led to the beginning of Temposhark. Diament and Busby both graduated in 2005 with First Class Honours. Other key bands/artists that studied alongside them were The Departure, Pure Reason Revolution, Kevin Mark Trail (The Streets) and Emmy The Great.

Temposhark 

Producer/songwriter Luke Busby arrived on the music scene in 2004 as a member of critically acclaimed UK electronic rock band Temposhark with singer/songwriter Robert Diament. Busby developed Temposhark's trademark sound – crisp, electronic production combining epic filmscore string parts with late 70s/early 80s synths. Temposhark's first UK single out in December 2005 is a collaboration with producer Guy Sigsworth, best known for his work with Madonna and Björk.

Temposhark finished recording their debut album The Invisible Line during February 2007 in London with producer Sean McGhee as well as recording a new song with Guy Sigsworth. It was released worldwide in 2008. Temposhark were in New York City on a UK music industry trade mission in June 2006 and started performing live in Europe including a sold out headline gig in Paris the following July. In November 2006, Temposhark began performing with their live band, Mathis Richet on drums and Mark Ferguson on bass. The four live musicians travelled to the USA to Austin, Texas in March 2007 for two live showcases at the SXSW festival. Temposhark head out on their first USA clubs and theatre tour in June 2007 supporting popstar Darren Hayes.

As part of Temposhark, Busby worked with a diverse array of musicians from Frou Frou's Guy Sigsworth and Imogen Heap, Kate Havnevik, Sophie Solomon, Sean McGhee, Cursor Miner, Avril (FCommunications), Metronomy, Mark Moore (S'Express), M.I.A., Camille, Hellogoodbye, Akira The Don, Noblesse Oblige, Princess Julia, Richard Norris (The Grid), Melnyk, Kevin Freeman, Border Crossing and Masashi Naka (Escalator Records, Japan).

Busby amicably left Temposhark in December 2007 to pursue a career in CGI and Motion Graphic Design. He has remained friends with Robert Diament. In October 2009, a Temposhark mix album Remixes & Rarities was released featuring a number of previously unreleased songs and b-sides produced by Busby.

Discography

CDs 
 Sid Busby "A Time For Love" (2001)
 "Midsummer Dream" (co-written/production)

Temposhark 

 The Invisible Line (2008 debut album)
 Remixes & Rarities (2009 mix album)

References

External links 
 Luke Busby's official MySpace page
 
 Temposhark's official MySpace page

1981 births
Ableton Live users
Alumni of the University of Westminster
English electronic musicians
English record producers
English keyboardists
English multi-instrumentalists
English pianists
English songwriters
Living people
21st-century pianists